Denmark participated in and won the Eurovision Song Contest 2000 with the song "Fly on the Wings of Love" written by Jørgen Olsen. The song was performed by the Olsen Brothers. The Danish broadcaster DR organised the national final Dansk Melodi Grand Prix 2000 in order to select the Danish entry for the 2000 contest in Stockholm, Sweden. Ten songs competed in a televised show where "Smuk som et stjerneskud" performed by the Olsen Brothers was the winner as decided upon through two rounds of jury voting and public voting. The song was later translated from Danish to English for the Eurovision Song Contest and was titled "Fly on the Wings of Love".

Denmark competed in the Eurovision Song Contest which took place on 13 May 2000. Performing during the show in position 14, Denmark placed first out of the 24 participating countries, winning the contest with 195 points. This was Denmark's second win in the Eurovision Song Contest; their first victory was in 1963.

Background 

Prior to the 2000 contest, Denmark had participated in the Eurovision Song Contest twenty-nine times since its first entry in 1957. The Danish national broadcaster, DR, broadcasts the event within Denmark and organises the selection process for the nation's entry. The broadcaster organised the Dansk Melodi Grand Prix 2000 national final in order to select Denmark's entry for the 2000 contest; Denmark has selected all of their Eurovision entries through Dansk Melodi Grand Prix.

Before Eurovision

Dansk Melodi Grand Prix 2000 
Dansk Melodi Grand Prix 2000 was the 31st edition of Dansk Melodi Grand Prix, the music competition that selects Denmark's entries for the Eurovision Song Contest. The event was held on 19 February 2000 at the Cirkusbygningen in Copenhagen, hosted by Natasja Crone Back and Michael Carøe and televised on DR1. The national final was watched by 1.356 million viewers in Denmark, making it the most popular show of the week in the country.

Format 
Ten songs competed in one show where the winner was determined over two rounds of voting. In the first round, the top five songs based on the combination of votes from a public televote and a seven-member jury panel qualified to the superfinal. In the superfinal, the winner was determined again by the votes of the jury and public.

The seven-member jury panel was composed of:

 Charlotte Nilsson – Swedish singer and television host, winner of the Eurovision Song Contest 1999
 Michael Teschl – singer and composer, represented Denmark in the Eurovision Song Contest 1999
 Bjørn Tidmand – singer, represented Denmark in the Eurovision Song Contest 1964
 Marie Carmen Koppel – singer
 Richard Herrey – Swedish singer, radio host and television producer, winner of the Eurovision Song Contest 1984 as part of Herreys
 Christian Ingebrigtsen – Norwegian singer-songwriter
 Lecia Jønsson – singer

Competing entries 
DR received 100 entries from composers invited for the competition. A selection committee selected ten songs from the entries submitted to the broadcaster, while the artists of the selected entries were chosen by DR in consultation with their composers. The competing songs were announced on 13 December 1999 with their artists being announced on 14 January 2000. Among the artists were Gry Johansen who represented Denmark in the Eurovision Song Contest 1983, and Fenders which represented Denmark in the Eurovision Song Contest 1987 as Bandjo.

Final 
The final took place on 19 February 2000. In the first round of voting the top five advanced to the superfinal based on the votes of a public televote (4/5) and a seven-member jury (1/5). In the superfinal, the winner, "Smuk som et stjerneskud" performed by Olsen Brothers, was selected by the public and jury vote. The jury voting results along with the voting results of each of Denmark's four regions in the superfinal were converted to points which were each distributed as follows: 4, 6, 8, 10 and 12 points.

At Eurovision
According to Eurovision rules, all nations with the exceptions of the bottom six countries in the 1999 contest competed in the final on 13 May 2000. A special allocation draw was held which determined the running order and Denmark was set to perform in position 14, following the entry from Spain and before the entry from Germany. At the contest, the Olsen Brothers performed the English version of "Smuk som et stjerneskud", titled "Fly on the Wings of Love". Denmark won the contest placing first with a score of 195 points. This was Denmark's second victory in the Eurovision Song Contest; their first victory was in 1963.

The show was broadcast on DR1 with commentary by Keld Heick. The Danish spokesperson, who announced the Danish votes during the final, was 1999 Danish Eurovision entrant Michael Teschl. The contest was watched by a total of 1.4 million viewers in Denmark.

Voting 
Below is a breakdown of points awarded to Denmark and awarded by Denmark in the contest. The nation awarded its 12 points to Iceland in the contest.

Congratulations: 50 Years of the Eurovision Song Contest

In 2005, "Fly on the Wings of Love" was one of fourteen songs chosen by Eurovision fans and an EBU reference group to participate in the Congratulations anniversary competition. Although it was the only Danish entry featured, Denmark were central to the special, as it was hosted at Forum Copenhagen by the Danish national broadcaster. Numerous Danish acts appeared both during the show and in the clip montages (which all received notably louder applause from the Danish crowd than the other acts). The special was broadcast live on DR with Nicolai Molbech providing Danish-language commentary.

"Fly on the Wings of Love" appeared eighth in the running order, following "Waterloo" by ABBA and preceding "Poupée de cire, poupée de son" by France Gall. Like the majority of entries that night, the performance was mostly by a group of dancers alongside footage of the Olsen Brothers' Eurovision performance, with the duo themselves appearing to lip-sync along with the final verse (they would later re-appear to perform a Eurovision-themed version of their song "Walk Right Back" alongside Linda Martin, Eimear Quinn, Charlie McGettigan, and Jakob Sveistrup, who were appearing as backing singers; the Brothers performed the original version during the opening of the 2001 contest). At the end of the first round, "Fly on the Wings of Love" was not one of the five entries announced as proceeding to the second round. It was later revealed that the song finished sixth with 111 points, thereby making it the closest non-qualifier to reaching the second round. In both the first and second round, in spite of having the opportunity to vote for their own entry, Denmark awarded twelve points to neighboring Sweden and ABBA's "Waterloo," which wound up winning. They awarded their own entry ten points, although fellow Nordic nation Iceland gave it their twelve points.

Voting

References 

2000
Countries in the Eurovision Song Contest 2000
Eurovision
Eurovision